Ismail Mire Elmi, was a renowned Somali poet and. Regarding his poetry, one observer said his voice and poetic ability was "so great that he could sing his countrymen into peace or war".

Military career
Mire was born in 1862 in the vicinity of Buuhoodle to a Dhulbahante Bah Cali Gheri family. His life began in pastoralist and nomadic settings along the Haud plains which is the lifestyle he returned to towards the end of his life. Upon becoming a Darwiish, he began heading the army and military intelligence, he also supervised the maintenance of the numerous forts that were built by the Darwiish. Upon the defeat of the Darwiish, he was captured, and spent a stint in a Berbera prison. Mire is one of the most successful generals in African history, with Mire leading the charges that led to the killing of Richard Corfield and destroyed almost the entirety of his battalion, besides successful raids or annexations of territories ranging from Berbera and Las Khorey in the north, Jigjiga to the west and Beledweyne to the south, thus by 1915 domineering over an area almost the size of Germany. The first decade of offensives cost the British government 29 million pounds sterlings (not adjusted to inflation).

According to Pergamon Press, Ismail Mire was "the most important general of the dervish forces and an accomplished poet and stylist".

Ilig treaty
In 1905, the Ilig treaty was signed between the Darwiish and the Italians who also signed on behalf of the two other colonial powers, the British and the Abyssinians. The treaty stipulated peace between the Darwiish and the three colonial powers and designated the Darwiish as an Italian protectorate. The territory of the Darwiish was also demarcated in this treaty between the Majeerteen Sultanate at Ras Gabbe (Gabbac) and Hobyo Sultanate at Ras Garad (Garacad); further territory was assigned for grazing, namely in Halin, a few miles east of Taleh to the north,  Hudin (Xudun) to the northwest, Tifafle (between Ade Adeye and Las Anod) to the west, Danot to the southwest, and Mudug to the south.

Poetry
Some of his notable poems include:
 Maxaa Xiga
 Guuguulayhow
 Iibsi Lacageed
 Xoogsi
 Hashii Markab
 Isma Oga
 Annagoo Taleex Naal
 Gelin Dhexe
 Galow-Kiciye

Death of Corfield
Prior to their encounter with Corfield, the Dervishes began a recruitment campaign in various localities in northern Somalia. For instance, in December 1912, A group of 150 Darwiish went to Ainabo wherein they tried to recruit to Dhulbahante there with promises of 100 camels for each rifleman or horseman who joined. In August 1913, upon killing Richard Corfield and his battalion, Ismail Mire composed the "Death of Corfield" poem:

Somali proverbs
Ismail Mire is also known for contriving traditional sayings that expressed in a metaphorical sense the truths based on common sense or experience of the Nugaal region:

Legacy
Ismail Mire International Airport in Buuhoodle is named in honour of Mire.

Autobiography book written on Ismaaciil Mire; by Ahmed Farah Ali, 1974

References

1862 births
1950 deaths
Directors of intelligence agencies
Commanders in chief
Somalian poets